Hendrik G. "Hank" Meijer (born 1952) is an American billionaire businessman, co-chairman and CEO of the US supermarket chain Meijer.

Early life
Hank Meijer is the son of Lena Rader and Frederik Meijer, and grandson of Hendrik Meijer, who founded the US supermarket chain Meijer in 1934. He was educated at Creston High School. In 1973, he graduated from the University of Michigan with a degree in literature.

Career
From 1973 to 1979, Meijer was a journalist. In 1979, he joined Meijer, rising to co-chairman and CEO.

According to Forbes, Hank and Doug Meijer have a joint net worth of $7.8 billion, as of June 2015.

Personal life
He has three children from his first marriage, and is now married to Liesel Litzenburger, a writer and novelist. He lives in Grand Rapids, Michigan.

He was a close friend of President and Mrs. Gerald R. Ford, and is vice-chairman and a trustee of the Gerald R. Ford Presidential Foundation.

In 2015, his daughter's British ex-husband was jailed for 12 years for attempting to blackmail the family.

His son, Peter Meijer, is a former Republican Party congressman for Michigan's 3rd congressional district.

Works

References

External links

1952 births
Living people
American retail chief executives
American billionaires
Businesspeople from Grand Rapids, Michigan
Hank
University of Michigan College of Literature, Science, and the Arts alumni
American chief executives of food industry companies